Ruk Jung (English title The Memory; literal translation, "So Much Love") is a 2006 Thai romantic-comedy film directed by Haeman Chatemee and starring "Film" Ratchaphoom Tokongsup and Paula Taylor.

Plot 
Superstar singer Film is involved in a car accident in the rural, remote mountain forests of northern Thailand. He is rescued by some hill tribe people, but because he has amnesia, he can't remember who he is. A paparazza named Jaa has followed Film. Before the accident, Film and Jaa were enemies, but now he thinks that she is someone he might have loved in his past life brought back to him by the legendary fireflies.

Cast 
 Rattapoom Toekongsap as Film
 Paula Taylor as Jaa
 Duangrudee Boonbumroong as Aaloo
 Somphong Kunapratom as Lawsoo
 Khwannapa Reuangsri as Aalaa

Awards 
 2007 Thailand National Film Association Awards – Best cinematography

External links 
 

2006 films
RS Film films
Thai-language films
2006 romantic comedy films
Thai romantic comedy films